Nasir al-Din Shahriyar was the Baduspanid ruler (ustandar) of Rustamdar from 1317 to 1325. He was the brother and successor of Shams al-Muluk Muhammad.

During his reign, Shahriyar cut all contact with the Mongol Ilkhanate, and supported his brother-in-law, the Bavandid ruler Shah-Kaykhusraw against the Mongol commander Mu'min and his son Kutlushah, and the powerful Kiya Jalali family of Sari. Shahriyar was murdered in 1325 by his nephew Iskandar at the instigation of brother Taj al-Dawla Ziyar, who took the throne.

References

Sources 
 

14th-century Baduspanid rulers
1325 deaths
Year of birth unknown